Benning Moulton Bean (January 9, 1782 – February 6, 1866) was an American farmer and politician. He served as a United States Representative from New Hampshire, as a member of the New Hampshire Senate, and as a member of the New Hampshire House of Representatives.

Early life and career
Born in Moultonborough, New Hampshire, Bean was the son of Moody Bean. He attended public schools, received private tutoring and became involved in teaching and agricultural pursuits.

Political career
He served as Selectman for Moultonborough from 1811 to 1829 and from 1832 to 1838. He was Justice of the Peace in 1816, and trustee of Sandwich Academy in 1824. A member of the New Hampshire House of Representatives from 1815 to 1823, Bean also served in the New Hampshire Senate from 1824 to 1826. He served as a member of the New Hampshire House of Representatives again in 1827. In 1829, he was member of the Governor's council.

Bean served in the New Hampshire Senate again in 1831 and 1832, and was president of the State Senate in 1832. He was elected as a Jacksonian candidate to the Twenty-third and Twenty-fourth Congresses, serving in Congress March 4, 1833 – March 3, 1837. During his time in Congress, Bean was an advocate for temperance and helped form the Congressional Temperance Society with George N. Briggs in 1833. He served as president of the society. He declined to be a candidate for renomination in 1836, and resumed teaching and agricultural pursuits in Moultonborough,

Death
Bean died in Moultonborough, Carroll County, New Hampshire on February 6, 1866 (age 84 years, 28 days). He is interred at Bean Cemetery in Moultonborough.

Personal life
On May 31, 1812, Bean married Eliza Ramsey. They had one daughter who died in childhood. After Eliza's death, he married Lydia Adams on October 30, 1817. They had six sons and four daughters together, including John Q. A. Bean, Benjamin F. Bean, A. A. Bean, George L. Bean, William E. Bean and Hannah J. Bean.

References

External links
Biographical Directory of the United States Congress

1782 births
1866 deaths
People from Moultonborough, New Hampshire
Members of the New Hampshire House of Representatives
New Hampshire state senators
Members of the Executive Council of New Hampshire
Presidents of the New Hampshire Senate
Jacksonian members of the United States House of Representatives from New Hampshire
19th-century American politicians